Ordsall is a village in the Bassetlaw District of Nottinghamshire, England, near the market town of Retford.  The village contains seven listed buildings that are recorded in the National Heritage List for England.  Of these, one is at Grade II*, the middle of the three grades, and the others are at Grade II, the lowest grade.  The listed buildings consist of a church, its former rectory, a war memorial in the churchyard, and houses and cottages with associated structures.


Key

Buildings

References

Citations

Sources

 

Lists of listed buildings in Nottinghamshire